Devara Hipparagi is a New Taluk of Vijayapura district, Karnataka, India.

Geography
It has an average elevation of 500 metres (1640 feet). It is major market hub for near by villages. The location of Devara Hipparagi is accessible by road. It is a major junction to reach or divert the routes to Bijapur, Bagalkot, Indi, Gulbarga, Muddebihal, Talikot, Sindagi & Solapur.

Demographics
 India census, Devar Hipparagi had a population of 16,554. Males constitute 51 percent of the population and females 49 percent. Devar Hipparagi has an average literacy rate of 56 percent, lower than the national average of 59.5 percent: male literacy is 63 percent, and female literacy is 49 percent. 16 percent of the population is under 6.

Points of interest
There are nearly 40 temples in Devara Hipparagi, including Mallayya, Ravutaraya, Kalmeshwar, Madiwal machidev, Karidevru, and Baanati. The fourteenth-century monument Mahalagumb (Deepstumb) is on the ground of Mallayya temple.

See also
Bijapur
Sindagi
Basavana Bagewadi
Kalaburagi
Muddebihal
Bagalkot

References

External links

Cities and towns in Bijapur district, Karnataka